Eleanor Randolph Wilson McAdoo (October 16, 1889 – April 5, 1967) was an American writer and the youngest daughter of American president Woodrow Wilson and Ellen Louise Axson. Wilson had two sisters, Margaret Woodrow Wilson and Jessie Woodrow Wilson Sayre.

Biography
She was born on October 16, 1889 to Woodrow Wilson and Ellen Axson Wilson in Middletown, Connecticut. She was educated at Saint Mary's School, an Episcopal boarding school for girls in Raleigh, North Carolina.

She married William Gibbs McAdoo, Wilson's Secretary of the Treasury, at the White House on May 7, 1914. They had two daughters: Ellen Wilson McAdoo (1915–1946) and Mary Faith McAdoo (1920–1988). She divorced McAdoo in July 1935.

Because she had written a biography about her father, she served as an informal counselor on the 1944 biopic Wilson. In 1965, she became largely incapacitated after suffering a cerebral hemorrhage.

McAdoo died at her home in Montecito, California, at 77. She was interred at the Santa Barbara Cemetery, Santa Barbara, California. She was the last surviving child of Woodrow Wilson.

Family
 Woodrow Wilson, father
 Ellen Axson Wilson, mother
 Edith Bolling, stepmother
 William Gibbs McAdoo, former husband
 Margaret Wilson, sister
 Jessie Woodrow Wilson Sayre, sister

Publications 
 The Woodrow Wilsons by Eleanor Wilson McAdoo (McMillan, 1937)
 Julia and the White House "An American girl finds herself in the exciting yet sobering limelight of the White House" (Dodd, Mead, 1946)

References

External links

Guide to the Wilson-McAdoo Collection, ca. 1859-1967

1889 births
1967 deaths
19th-century American women
20th-century American women writers
20th-century American writers
People from Middletown, Connecticut
St. Mary's School (North Carolina) alumni
Writers from California
Writers from Connecticut
Woodrow Wilson family
Children of presidents of the United States
Spouses of California politicians